Rebecca Joanne Jago (née Gunton; born 20 April 1976 in Bury St Edmunds, Suffolk) is an English television news presenter, currently employed by ITV Anglia.

Career
Jago attended Stowmarket High School from 1989 to 1994. She graduated from the University of Bedfordshire in 1997 with a BA in Media Performance and then spent some time in Japan, where she worked in a public bar.

Jago started her career at Vibe FM radio station (subsequently known as Vibe 105-108, and now known as Kiss 105-108), working her way up from researcher to become the co-presenter on the breakfast show. After appearing in a television documentary about Vibe FM, she was spotted by producers of ITV News Anglia who hired her as their weather presenter, and she also appeared on Channel 5's The Wright Stuff, where she would introduce phone-in contributors.

In November 2001, she joined the CBBC children's news programme Newsround, becoming one of the two main presenters. While she worked on the programme, she appeared on a celebrity version of The Weakest Link but was the first to be eliminated after incorrectly answering the 50/50 question, "What is the safest way to read a firework instruction manual - A torch or a match?"

Jago joined Capital London on 28 February 2003 to be Chris Tarrant's foil on Capital Breakfast. She stayed with the new host Johnny Vaughan after Tarrant left in 2004, but her involvement ended when her contract ended in December 2004. She then had stints as a reporter on GMTV's Entertainment Today programme, and Sky Sports News, before returning to ITV Anglia in May 2005 as a feature reporter and presenter. Since 12 February 2009, Jago has been the co-presenter of ITV News Anglia, alongside Jonathan Wills.

Personal life
An Ipswich Town supporter, Jago played football from school level, and in various works teams. Her mother died of breast cancer, and Jago supports charities in this area.

Jago married in December 2004, and lives in Norfolk with her husband and her twin sons. On 17 October 2012 she gave birth to her third child, another boy. Jago returned to ITV News Anglia on 5 November 2013.

References

External links

1976 births
Living people
British television presenters
Newsround presenters
ITV regional newsreaders and journalists
Mass media people from Bury St Edmunds
Alumni of the University of Bedfordshire
Capital (radio network)